"(If You're Not in It for Love) I'm Outta Here!" is a song co-written and recorded by Canadian country music singer Shania Twain. It was released in November 1995 as the fourth single from her second studio album, The Woman in Me (1995). Written by Mutt Lange and Twain, the song became her second number-one hit at country radio and the first single to be promoted with three different mixes worldwide to cater to international genre demand. The song topped the US Billboard Hot Country Songs chart and was her breakthrough hit in Australia, peaking at number five on the ARIA Singles Chart. "I'm Outta Here!" was later included on Twain's 2004 Greatest Hits package, and has been performed on all of her tours. In 1997, the Eurodance group Real McCoy covered "I'm Outta Here!".

Chart performance
"I'm Outta Here!" debuted at number 69 on the US Billboard Hot Country Singles & Tracks chart the week of November 18, 1995. It spent 20 weeks on the chart and peaked at number one on February 3, 1996, where it remained for two weeks. This would give Twain her second number-one single, second top-10 single, and fourth consecutive top-20 single. The song also topped the Country Singles Sales chart for one week. "I'm Outta Here!" was Twain's second single on the Billboard Hot 100, where it charted at number 74.

Internationally, "I'm Outta Here!" became Twain's first hit, as well as first chart appearance at all, when it made the Top 5 in Australia. It debuted on November 24, 1996, at number 37. It climbed to number five on January 26, 1997, where it remained for two weeks. It spent a total of 22 weeks on the chart.

Music video
The music video for "I'm Outta Here!" was shot in New York City and directed by Steven Goldmann. It was filmed on November 4, 1995, and released 11 days later. The video is radically different from Twain's previous videos, and its pop rock feel and sex appeal engendered into most of Twain's subsequent videos.

The video begins with a shot of Twain standing behind a blue light in front of a man sitting on a chair. She walks up to the man, who stands up and flips over his chair, meanwhile, the video cuts to a slow-motion shot of people dancing in a club and a shot of Twain walking up to a microphone in front of her and surrounded by many people playing drums. It cuts back to Twain trying to sit on the chair, when the man kicks it away for her to fall on the floor. But the next shot of them is them laughing and pushing away as people start to come over. In the subsequent shots, intercut with shots of Twain performing alone without the drums, Twain and several others drumming near a window, and Twain on a balcony, friends grab the microphone off of Twain and engage in a karaoke session with her, male stereotypes try to turn on Twain near the microphone, Twain teaches people a dance routine, people play air guitar with fake guitars, and Twain plays along to the drummers. In the final shot, Twain walks out of the building alone.

Three versions of the video were released; the 'Album Version' for country music video channels, the 'Mutt Lange Remix' for Australia and the 'Dance Remix' for Canadian pop channels. The 'Album Version' video is available on Twain's DVD The Platinum Collection, while the 'Mutt Lange Mix' video is available on iTunes, VEVO and YouTube. The video won the Video of the Year Award at the 1996 Canadian Country Music Awards.

On video-sharing website YouTube, the video is one of Twain's least-viewed videos on the platform, with only 2.8 million views as of February 2021.

Live performances
During Shania's Come On Over Tour and Up! Tour, the song was performed as the last main song of the setlist before returning to the stage for her encores. Each of the cities Twain visited on both tours, she would invite a local school Marching Band drum line to join her on stage. Twain would also play the drums along as well on stage. At the end of the song on the Come On Over Tour, Twain leads the drummers into a drum roll, which leads into a grand finale, including Twain standing on top of a big drum, while an electric lap steel guitar solo plays, before disappearing into it as fireworks and confetti erupt from the stage. On the Up! Tour, she again leads the drummers in joining in a big drum roll which lets off the fireworks with Twain disappearing after the song ends. The song has also been performed during her Vegas residency and her Rock This Country tour as the last song before the encore.

Track listings

 US 7-inch single
A. "(If You're Not in It for Love) I'm Outta Here!" — 4:30
B. "The Woman in Me (Needs the Man in You)" — 4:50

 US cassette single
A. "(If You're Not in It for Love) I'm Outta Here!" (remix) — 4:21
B. "If It Don't Take Two" — 3:40

 Australian CD single
 "(If You're Not in It for Love) I'm Outta Here!" (Mutt Lange Mix) — 4:21
 "(If You're Not in It for Love) I'm Outta Here!" (dance mix) — 4:40
 "No One Needs to Know" — 3:04

 Australian remixes CD and cassette single
 "(If You're Not in It for Love) I'm Outta Here!" (Mutt Lange Mix) — 4:21
 "God Bless the Child" (extended version) — 3:48
 "(If You're Not in It for Love) I'm Outta Here!" (dance mix) — 4:40
 "(If You're Not in It for Love) I'm Outta Here!" (album version) — 4:30
 "No One Needs to Know" — 3:04

Personnel
Personnel are lifted from The Woman in Me liner notes.

 Larry Byrom – acoustic guitar
 Billy Crain – slide guitar
 Paul Franklin – pedal steel guitar, pedal-bro
 Rob Hajacos – fiddle
 Dan Huff – electric guitar
 David Hungate – bass guitar
 Nick Keka – handclaps
 Mutt Lange – handclaps
 Paul Leim – drums, door slam
 Terry McMillan – harmonica, cowbell
 Matt Rollings – piano
 Brent Rowan – electric guitar
 Shania Twain – lead and harmony vocals, handclaps, footsteps

Charts

Weekly charts

Year-end charts

Certifications

Real McCoy version

In 1997, German Eurodance Real McCoy released "(If You're Not in It for Love) I'm Outta Here!" as the third and final single from their album "One More Time". It peaked at 102 on the US Hot Dance Club Songs.

Track listing
CD single
 "(If You're Not In It For Love) I'm Outta Here" (Radio Mix) – 4:10
 "(If You're Not In It For Love) I'm Outta Here" (Album Version) – 3:58
 "Party" - 3:57

CD maxi single
 "(If You're Not In It For Love) I'm Outta Here" (Extended Radio Mix) – 6:51
 "(If You're Not In It For Love) I'm Outta Here" (Forthright Club Mix) – 7:51
 "(If You're Not In It For Love) I'm Outta Here" (That Kid Chris Outta Here Mix) – 10:55
 "I Wanna Come (With You)" (Soul Solution Dub) – 8:34

References

1995 singles
1995 songs
1997 singles
Canadian Country Music Association Video of the Year videos
Mercury Records singles
Mercury Nashville singles
Music videos directed by Steven Goldmann
PolyGram singles
Real McCoy (band) songs
Shania Twain songs
Song recordings produced by Robert John "Mutt" Lange
Songs written by Robert John "Mutt" Lange
Songs written by Shania Twain